The 2021-22 American International Yellow Jackets men's ice hockey season was the 74th season of play for the program. They represented American International College in the 2021–22 NCAA Division I men's ice hockey season and for the 19th season in the Atlantic Hockey conference. The Yellow Jackets were coached by Eric Lang, in his sixth season, and played their home games at MassMutual Center.

Season
AIC entered the season looking to continue its run as the Atlantic Hockey champion but didn't get off to a good start. While due in part to the difficulty of their schedule, the Yellow Jackets began with just 3 wins in their first 13 games. While they got solid, if unspectacular, goaltending from both grad transfer Alec Calvaruso and nominal starter Jake Kucharski, American International was let down by its offense. In just 4 of those 13 games, the team managed to score more than 2 goals.

In late-November, the offense finally got going and the team went on an extended winning streak as a result. AIC won 11 consecutive games, including a defeat of Connecticut, who ended the season in the top-20. The run shot the Yellow Jackets to the top of the Atlantic Hockey standings, where they remained for the rest of the year. While their winning streak nearly put them into the poll themselves, AIC came back down to earth a bit at the end of the regular season. With their 4th-consecutive Atlantic Hockey title in hand, AIC still had to win the conference tournament in order to make the NCAA Tournament.

Prior to the start of their postseason, AIC got some unwelcome news when Kucharski went down with an undisclosed injury. Despite missing the conference goaltending champion, American International had a capable backup in Calvaruso and he showed up during the playoffs. Calvaruso won all four games for the Yellow Jackets, posting a 2.00 goals against average. It was, however, Blake Bennett who was the story for AIC; the junior forward scored recorded 10 points during their run, including a hat-trick in the semifinal against Mercyhurst, and was named Tournament MVP.

American International made its third consecutive appearance in the NCAA championship but, as is typical for Atlantic Hockey, they did so against the #1 seed once again. The team faced Michigan, who boasted one of, if not the, most talent-laden teams in NCAA history. The Yellow Jackets, on the other hand, possessed only one NHL-drafted player and he (Kucharski) was still out due to injury. Early on it appeared that the Wolverines would just roll over AIC when they scored twice in the first 5 minutes of the game. The Yellow Jackets fought back, however, and demonstrated that they weren't to be taken lightly. American International ended up outshooting Michigan 32-31 in the game and scored three goals, but it wasn't enough. Even with the loss, the credible performance showed that AIC could compete with the elite college hockey programs.

Departures

Recruiting

Roster
As of August 23, 2021.

|}

Standings

Schedule and results

|-
!colspan=12 style=";" | Exhibition

|-
!colspan=12 style=";" | Regular season

|-
!colspan=12 style=";" | 

|- align="center" bgcolor="#e0e0e0"
|colspan=12|American International Won Series 2–0

|-
!colspan=12 style=";" |

Scoring statistics

Goaltending statistics

Rankings

Note: USCHO did not release a poll in week 24.

Awards and honors

References

2021–22
2021–22 Atlantic Hockey men's ice hockey season
2021–22 NCAA Division I men's ice hockey by team
2021 in sports in Massachusetts
2022 in sports in Massachusetts